Andrew Robert Marks (born February 22, 1955), is an American cardiologist and molecular biologist. He is Professor and Chair of the Department of Physiology and Cellular Biophysics  at Columbia University College of Physicians and Surgeons, Founding Director of the Clyde and Helen Wu Center for Molecular Cardiology, and a Wu Professor of Medicine.

Marks developed the first drug-eluting stent coated with rapamycin in an effort to reduce fatty plaque buildup on the stent material itself.

References

External links
Marks lab web site

1955 births
American cardiologists
American molecular biologists
Columbia University faculty
Amherst College alumni
Icahn School of Medicine at Mount Sinai faculty
Living people
Journal of Clinical Investigation editors
Members of the National Academy of Medicine